S.H.E is a Taiwanese girl group. This entry is a list of all concert tours and live performances held by Taiwanese girl group S.H.E so far.

Standalone concerts

One-off concerts

Concert tours

Fantasy Land world tour 
"Fantasy Land world tour" is S.H.E's the first world tour. The tour started in the Taipei Stadium, Taiwan on September 4, 2004, and the tour ended in Genting Highlands, Malaysia on January 7, 2006 as the final performance, and the world tour extended from Asia to North America. The tour had a total of 9 performances.

Perfect 3 world tour 
"Perfect 3 world tour" is S.H.E's the second world tour. The tour started in the Shanghai Stadium, China on July 8, 2006, and the tour ended in Stadium Merdeka, Malaysia on December 1, 2007 as the final performance, and the tour had a total of 11 performances. And then one and a half years later, the tour added another special stop in Macau on June 20, 2009, so the tour had a total of 12 performances.

*special stop

S.H.E is the One world tour 
"S.H.E is the One world tour" is S.H.E's the third world tour. The tour started in the Hong Kong Coliseum, Hong Kong on October 16&17, 2009, and the tour ended in Sydney Entertainment Centre, Australia on September 17, 2010 as the final performance, and the world tour extended from Asia to Oceania. The tour had a total of 12 performances.

2gether 4ever world tour 
"2gether 4ever world tour" is S.H.E's the fourth world tour. The tour started in the Taipei Arena, Taiwan on June 22&23, 2013, and the tour ended in Singapore on October 26, 2013 temporary as the final performance, and then S.H.E announced that it will start up "2gether 4ever World Tour Encore" in 2014. Finally, the tour ended in Guangzhou, China on August 23, 2014, and the whole concert tour had a total of 22 performances. The total box office is more than 660 million NT dollars.

Co-organized concerts

References 

Live
Lists of concert tours